Sian Mary Williams (born 28 November 1964) is a Welsh journalist, current affairs presenter best known for her work with the BBC, and psychologist.

From 2001 until 2012, Williams regularly presented weekday editions of BBC Breakfast as well as all main news bulletins on BBC One. She presented two series of BBC One's discussion programme Sunday Morning Live from 2014 until 2015.

Since January 2016, she has been the main presenter of 5 News at 5. In March 2022 ITN announced Williams was to leave her daily presenting role. Williams said in the announcement she planned to continue with some broadcasting projects, but also devote more time to "delivering psychological support". Williams is a registered counselling psychologist with the Health and Care Professionals Council.

Early life
Williams was born in Paddington, London, to Welsh parents and was brought up in Eastbourne, East Sussex. Her mother, Katherine Rees, was from Llanelli and had moved to London to become a nurse. Williams' father was from Swansea, and his family had been farmers in Glamorgan. He was a journalist, working first in print and later in radio. Williams has two younger twin brothers. She gained a BA degree in English and History from Oxford Polytechnic (now Oxford Brookes University), and studied critical journalistic writing at the University of Rhode Island. In 2012, Williams began training in psychology, gaining an MSc degree from the University of Westminster, and was awarded a doctorate in counselling psychology in 2021 from City, University of London after working in the NHS and elsewhere.

Career
Williams joined the BBC in 1985 and began working as a reporter and producer for BBC Local Radio stations in Liverpool, Sheffield, Leeds and Manchester. From 1990 to 1997, she was editor for BBC Radio 4's The World at One and PM programmes. Williams was also a programme editor for a number of news and election specials across Radio 4 and BBC Radio 5 Live.

Prior to the channel's launch in 1997, Williams joined BBC News 24 as an output editor. During screen tests for potential presenters, one applicant became unwell and Williams was asked to step into the role. Producers were impressed with her performance and they offered her the prime presenting slot of 4:00 pm to 7:00 pm alongside Gavin Esler. She remained with the channel for nearly two years before joining BBC One's Six O'Clock News in 1999 as Special Correspondent. She became a relief presenter of the bulletin and in 2001 she became its main Friday presenter during Fiona Bruce's maternity leave. Williams also became a main presenter of the BBC One weekend news bulletins.

Williams joined BBC Breakfast on 12 January 2001 as a relief presenter, initially presenting on Friday–Sunday alongside Darren Jordon, to cover for main presenter, Sarah Montague, and then later with Jeremy Bowen, to cover for Sophie Raworth. She also regularly deputised on both the Six O'Clock News and the One O'Clock News during this period. In 2004, Williams covered for Raworth on the Six O'Clock News during her maternity leave, co-presenting with George Alagiah, and the following year, reported from Sri Lanka and Thailand on the 2004 Indian Ocean earthquake and from Pakistan on the Kashmir earthquake.

In May 2005 she was confirmed as the main female presenter of BBC Breakfast, presenting initially with Dermot Murnaghan and then Bill Turnbull from 2008. Williams left BBC Breakfast on 15 March 2012 after the programme's production team was relocated to Salford. In 2012 she rejoined BBC Radio 4 to co-present Saturday Live.

Williams has presented programmes outside of news and current affairs including The One Show, Big Welsh Challenge, Now You're Talking and City Hospital. In 2010, Williams was a reporter for Watchdog. In 2013, she hosted Your Money, Their Tricks with Nicky Campbell and Rebecca Wilcox. Williams also presented a three-part interview series for BBC One Wales titled The Sian Williams Interview featuring Tanni Grey-Thompson, Suzanne Packer and Siân Phillips.

In June 2014, Williams became the new presenter of Sunday Morning Live, BBC One's religious and ethical debating programme. She presented the programme for two series before stepping down and being replaced by Naga Munchetty in June 2016.

On 5 November 2015, Williams announced she would be leaving the BBC to become the new main presenter of 5 News. She presented her first 5 News bulletin on 4 January 2016. From 2017 to 2021 she co-presented Save Money: Good Health alongside Ranj Singh on ITV. and 'Secrets of your Supermarket Food on C5. Since 2021 Williams has presented a dedicated weekly mental health slot on 5 News called ‘Mind Matters with Dr Sian’, bringing positive awareness to issues like autism, ADHD, anxiety and depression. In March 2022 ITN announced Williams was to leave her daily presenting role at 5 News but would continue to front Mind Matters. Williams said in the announcement she planned to continue with some broadcasting projects, but also devote more time to "delivering psychological support".

In 2022, it was announced that she would be the new presenter of Radio 4's "Life Changing" programme;
 this series began in October.

Other work
Williams was president of TRIC (Television and Radio Industries Club) for 2008–09 and won the title of Best Presenter in 2012 and 2013. She became an Honorary Fellow of the University of Cardiff in July 2012. and was awarded the title of Doctor of Arts of Oxford Brookes University in 2017 in recognition of her outstanding contribution to the pursuit of academic excellence.

In 2016, Williams wrote a book on dealing with adversity; Rise: Surviving and Thriving after Trauma.

Personal life
In February 1991, Williams married Neale Hunt, a former director of advertising firm McCann Erickson, with whom she has two sons. Following the couple's divorce, Williams married Paul Woolwich in 2006, with whom she has two children. After giving birth to her third son in October 2006 she later disclosed in an interview that she received two litres of blood following complications.

Williams ran the 2001 New York City Marathon and spent several days recovering in hospital from hyponatraemia. After several years not participating in running, she completed the Virgin London Marathon in 2013 and 2018.

During filming for the BBC's Coming Home in November 2010, Williams discovered she was the first member of her family to have been born outside Wales in 350 years of her known family tree.

Health
In May 2016, Williams revealed she had undergone a double mastectomy after being diagnosed with breast cancer. She told Woman and Home magazine that she was diagnosed in 2014, a week after her 50th birthday. She said she had always thought she was healthy as she "did all the right things – I was a green tea drinker, a salmon eater, a runner". She said her main fear was not seeing her two youngest children grow up.

Filmography
City Hospital 
BBC Breakfast (2001–2012) – Co-presenter
Watchdog (2010) – Reporter
Crimewatch (2012, 2015) – Stand-in presenter
Your Money Their Tricks (2013) – Co-presenter
The Sian Williams Interview – Presenter
Sunday Morning Live (2014–2015) – Presenter
5 News at 5 (2016–2022) – Anchor 
Save Money: Lose Weight (2017) – Co-presenter
Save Money: Good Health (2017–present) – Co-presenter
Secrets of Your Supermarket Food (2018–present) - Presenter

References

External links
 Official website
 
Sian Williams at BBC News Online
 

1964 births
5 News presenters and reporters
Alumni of Liverpool John Moores University
Alumni of Oxford Brookes University
BBC newsreaders and journalists
Living people
People from Paddington
People from Southwark
Welsh journalists
Welsh women journalists
Welsh-speaking journalists
Psychotherapists
British psychologists